Saras (also Romanized as Sarās; also known as Sarask and Sarāsq) is a village in northern Iran, in Qaqazan-e Gharbi Rural District, in the Central District of Takestan County, Qazvin Province. At the 2006 census, its population was 300, in 70 families.

References 

Populated places in Takestan County